Khaled Mossad Karib (born 23 January 2000) is a Qatari professional footballer who plays as left-back for Qatari club Al-Khor.

Career
Khaled started his career with Al-Duhail and is a product of the Al-Duhail's youth system. On 31 January 2021, he joined Al-Khor.

References

External links 
 

2000 births
Living people
Qatari footballers
Association football fullbacks
Al-Duhail SC players
Al-Khor SC players
Qatar Stars League players